Charlie Hewitt may refer to:
 Charlie Hewitt (footballer)
 Charlie Hewitt (rugby union)
 Sheriff Hoyt, a character in Texas Chainsaw Massacre also known as Charlie Hewitt

See also
 Charles Hewitt (disambiguation)